This is a list of artworks made by James Turrell.  Works are listed on the chart by chronology, the oldest first to the newest at the bottom.

Light and space

Skyspace locations

References

Turrell